Marie-Eugénie de Jésus (25 August 1817 – 10 March 1898), born Anne-Eugénie Milleret de Brou, was a French religious sister and the foundress of the Religious of the Assumption. Her life was not geared towards faith in her childhood until the reception of her First Communion which seemed to transform her into a pious and discerning individual; she likewise experienced a sudden conversion after hearing a sermon that led her to found an order dedicated to the education of the poor. However, her religious life was not without its own set of trials, for complications prevented her order from receiving full pontifical approval due to a select few causing problems as well as the deaths of many followers from tuberculosis in the beginning of the order's life.

Her beatification was celebrated under Pope Paul VI in 1975 while her canonization was later celebrated on 3 June 2007 under Pope Benedict XVI.

Life
Anne-Eugénie Milleret de Brou was born during the night of 25 August 1817 in Metz as one of five children (three males and two females) to Jacques Milleret and Eleonore-Eugénie de Brou. Her baptism was celebrated on 5 October. Her father was a follower of Voltaire and a liberal which often put him into conflict with his diminishing faith. He made his fortune from banking and politics. Her parents met in Luxembourg when her father was 19 and her mother 22; the two married soon after. In 1822 her brother Charles (1813–1822) died and her little sister Elizabeth died in 1823. She had two older brothers, Eugene (b. 1802) and Louis (b. 1815–16). One distant ancestor was the Italian condottieri Miglioretti who served Francis I.

Young Milleret de Brou grew up in a chateau in the suburb of Priesch north of Paris. When she was 13, her father lost all his money and the family estate. Her parents separated in 1830 as a result of her father's financial misfortunes, and she moved to Paris with her mother while her brother Louis moved with their father. Milleret de Brou had a deep concern for the poor and tended to poor families; she often accompanied her mother visiting those poor families in need.

Milleret de Brou's mother died of cholera in 1832, after a short period of illness, and she spent the remainder of her teens between two sets of relations. On one side she found her family concerned with material pleasures, while the other demonstrated a narrow spirit of piousness. Separated from the brother who had been her main companion as a child, she wondered about life and how to live out the spirit of faith and justice that her mother had taught her. In 1825 she made a pilgrimage to the shrine of Sainte-Anne d'Auray where she felt called to found a religious order dedicated to educating the poor. On 25 December 1829, Christmas day, she took her First Communion and it proved to be a life-changing experience for her. Through the reception of this sacrament she experienced the presence of God – a profound spiritual moment – which proved to be one about which she would refer to the rest of her life.

During Lent in 1836 Milleret de Brou was invited to listen to a series of lectures at the Notre Dame cathedral at 10:00am which the then-Abbé Lacordaire, a famous preacher and social commentator, gave. His preaching lead her to have a profound conversion experience, and she became passionate about the messages from the Gospel and thus a dedicated servant to God. In July 1837 she returned to her father and brother whom she had not seen since her parents separated; she announced to them that she wanted to become a religious sister and she was heartbroken that her father and brother Louis found this dream incomprehensible.

She made a brief novitiate with the Sisters of the Visitation on 15 August 1838 before leaving. She went to confession to the Abbé Théodore Combalot, who told her that he was looking for someone to help him found a religious order devoted to the Blessed Mother and the education of the poor. He believed that she would be such a founder capable of seeing out his vision.

On 30 April 1839 Milleret de Brou founded the Religious of the Assumption with four companions. The congregation began in a small apartment on the Rue Ferou in Paris and celebrated their first Mass together as a religious congregation on 9 November 1839. In March 1841 she was made the Superior of the order and held the position until she resigned due to ill health in 1894. On 14 August 1841 she made her initial vows and then made her perpetual profession on 25 December 1844.

In May 1866 Marie-Eugénie de Jésus set off for Rome and visited the tomb of Saint Peter before setting off to visit the catacombs and other Roman churches, and then attending Mass in the room where Ignatius of Loyola died. On 31 May she had a private audience with Pope Pius IX. Marie-Eugénie de Jésus returned to Rome where on 11 April 1888 Pope Leo XIII issued pontifical approval to her order and signed the decree in her presence.

In 1893, Marie-Eugénie de Jésus returned to Rome and met Leo XIII again. In 1894 she attempted to return to Rome but had to stop in Genoa due to falling ill en route. In late 1894 she visited Madrid and San Sebastián. In March 1895 she went with her nurse Sister Marie Michel to Rome and made stops along the train to Montpellier and Nice as well as to Cannes and Genoa; she returned to France three months later.

The aging sister suffered a small stroke in October 1897 which caused her speech to slow; her legs began to grow frail and movement became more difficult over time. Marie-Eugénie de Jésus died on 10 March 1898 at 3:00am; she received the Viaticum on 9 March and received the Last Rites on 13 February when it seemed she would die despite her bouncing back from that scare. The Cardinal Archbishop of Reims Benoît-Marie Langénieux celebrated her funeral on 12 March. As of 2019 her order had 1300 followers from 44 different nationalities, operating in 34 countries on four continents.

Sainthood
The sainthood process opened in the Paris archdiocese in an informative process that Cardinal Jean Verdier oversaw from 1934 until its closure in 1936; her writings received theological approval on two separate occasions on 1 February 1939 and on 8 July 1949. The formal introduction to the cause came on 17 April 1940 under Pope Pius XII and she became titled as a Servant of God.

Cardinal Emmanuel Célestin Suhard oversaw the apostolic process from 1941 until 1943 before all documentation from both processes was sent to the Congregation for Rites in Rome who validated these processes on 14 December 1945. An antepreparatory committee approved the cause on 9 May 1951 as did a preparatory one (the first on 30 June 1953 was inconclusive) on 7 June 1960 and the general committee on 6 June 1961. On 21 June 1961 she became titled as Venerable after Pope John XXIII confirmed that she had lived a life of heroic virtue. Pope Paul VI beatified her on 9 February 1975 in Saint Peter's Square.

The miracle for canonization was opened and closed in 2003 in the Manila archdiocese while the Congregation for the Causes of Saints validated the process on 30 April 2004. Medical experts approved this miracle on 27 January 2005 as did the theologians on 14 February 2006 and the C.C.S. members on 12 December 2006. Pope Benedict XVI approved this miracle on 16 December 2006 and formalized the date for the canonization on 23 February 2007 at a consistory; Benedict XVI canonized her on 3 June 2007.

Miracle
The canonization miracle was the healing of Risa Bondoc (b. February 1995) who had a condition from her birth that prevented the two halves of her brain from joining. Her mother – who did not know of this condition – had put Risa up for adoption and so Ditos and Carmen Bondoc adopted her and had taken her to specialists, to no avail.

References

External links
 Hagiography Circle
 Religious of the Assumption
 The Wanderer
 Asia News
 Butler's Lives of the Saints

1817 births
1898 deaths
19th-century Christian saints
19th-century French nuns
19th-century venerated Christians
Assumptionist nuns
Beatifications by Pope Paul VI
Canonizations by Pope Benedict XVI
Christian female saints of the Late Modern era
French Roman Catholic saints
Founders of Catholic religious communities
People from Metz
Venerated Catholics